Genowefa Olejarz-Patla (born October 17, 1962 in Jeżowe, Podkarpackie) is a former javelin thrower from Poland, who represented her native country at the 1992 Summer Olympics in Barcelona, Spain. She set her personal best (65.96 m) in the women's javelin throw event in 1991.

Achievements

References
 

1962 births
Living people
Polish female javelin throwers
Athletes (track and field) at the 1992 Summer Olympics
Olympic athletes of Poland
People from Nisko County
Sportspeople from Podkarpackie Voivodeship
20th-century Polish women